Cleaver Lake is a lake in Thunder Bay District, Ontario, Canada. The primary inflow and outflow is the Whitesand River, and the lake is immediately upstream of Zenith Lake.

References

Lakes of Thunder Bay District